Samuel Hoyt Elbert (8 August 1907 – 14 May 1997) was an American linguist who made major contributions to Hawaiian and Polynesian lexicography and ethnography. Born on a farm in Des Moines, Iowa, to Hugh and Ethelind Elbert, Sam grew up riding horses, one of his favorite pastimes well into retirement. After graduating from Grinnell College with an A.B. in 1928, he earned a certificate in French at the University of Toulouse and traveled in Europe before returning to New York City, where he waited tables, clerked for a newspaper, reviewed books, and studied journalism at Columbia University. Wanderlust took him to French Polynesia, first to Tahiti and then to the Marquesas, where he quickly became proficient in Marquesan.
In 1936, he went to work for the United States Geological Survey in Hawaii. There he met researchers on Pacific languages and cultures at the Bishop Museum, chief among them Mary Kawena Pukui, from whom he learned Hawaiian and with whom he worked closely over a span of forty years. When war broke out in the Pacific, the U.S. Navy employed him as an intelligence officer studying the languages of strategically important islands. He was posted to Samoa in 1943, then to Micronesia, where he collected and published wordlists for several island languages.

After the war, encouraged by academics at the Bishop Museum and the University of Hawaii, he studied at Yale and at Indiana University, where he earned a Ph.D. in folklore in 1950, writing his thesis on 'The Chief in Hawaiian Mythology'. He was hired by the University of Hawaii in 1949, and taught classes in Hawaiian language and linguistics until he retired in 1972, introducing new teaching methods and new levels of rigor into Hawaiian language classes, which until then had a reputation for being easy.

In 1957, he began a longtime collaboration with the Danish scholar, Torben Monberg, on the Polynesian outliers of Rennell and Bellona in the Solomon Islands, making four trips to the islands. He spent a year in Denmark on a Fulbright scholarship in 1964–64 collaborating with Monberg on a monograph on the oral traditions of Rennell and Bellona. In 1988, he published a grammar of the language.

In 1972, he published a dictionary of the Puluwatese language followed by a grammar book of the language in 1974.

Selected works
In order of first publication:

»eBook available: 

»eBook available: 

»Partial preview of New Pocket Hawaiian Dictionary with a Concise Grammars and Given Names in Hawaiian at WorldCat

»Partial preview of Place Names of Hawaii at WorldCat

References
 

1907 births
1997 deaths
20th-century linguists
Linguists from the United States
Indiana University alumni
Grinnell College alumni
University of Toulouse alumni
Linguists of Austronesian languages
Fulbright alumni